Stany  is a village in the administrative district of Gmina Bojanów, within Stalowa Wola County, Subcarpathian Voivodeship, in south-eastern Poland.

Sports

Łęg Stany 
Łęg Stany is a Polish football club based. They currently compete in the B-class, the eight-tier of Poland professional football, having suffered relegation from the A-class in 2020–21. The club's name comes from the Łęg river, that flows through the village. The former football player of the club is Tomasz Karasiński, the III liga top-scorer with Tłoki Gorzyce.

Notable people
 Stanisław Mielech, a Polish footballer, originator of the name of the Legia Warsaw club

References

Stany
Kingdom of Galicia and Lodomeria
Lwów Voivodeship